In the case of a radio failure or aircraft not equipped with a radio, or in the case of a deaf pilot, air traffic control may use a signal lamp (called a "signal light gun" or "light gun" by the FAA) to direct the aircraft. ICAO regulations require air traffic control towers to possess such signal lamps. The signal lamp has a focused bright beam and is capable of emitting three different colours: red, white and green. These colors may be flashed or steady, and have different meanings to aircraft in flight or on the ground. Planes can acknowledge the instruction by rocking their wings, moving the ailerons if on the ground, or by flashing their landing or navigation lights during hours of darkness. Air traffic control signal light guns are typically specified with a (white) center beam brightness of > 180,000 - 200,000 candela, and are visible for roughly 4 miles in clear daylight conditions. The table below describes the meaning of the signals. The use of handheld combination red/green/white signal lamps for air traffic control dates back to at least the 1930s.

References

Airport infrastructure
Aviation communications
Air traffic control
Optical communications